Texas Hall is a historic building on the former campus of Trinity University in Tehuacana, Texas, U.S.. The land was donated by John Boyd. It was first designed in the Gothic Revival style by Joseph Schuster, and completed in 1871. It was subsequently redesigned by architect James E. Flanders in the Second Empire style between 1886 and 1892. Trinity University relocated to Waxahachie, Texas in 1902, and Westminster College moved into the building, up until 1942. The building is now known as the Trinity Institute.

The building has been listed on the National Register of Historic Places since July 12, 1978.

See also

National Register of Historic Places listings in Limestone County, Texas

References

External links

Buildings and structures on the National Register of Historic Places in Texas
Second Empire architecture in Texas
Buildings and structures completed in 1871
Buildings and structures in Limestone County, Texas